The Jardin de l'État, formerly known as the Jardin du Roy, is a historic botanical garden on the island of Réunion, found in the capital Saint-Denis.

Planted with trees and spices taken from outside the island by Pierre Poivre, the garden is home to a natural history museum opened in August 1855. The garden was built from 1767 to 1773.

The garden's golden era came at the beginning of the 19th century, when its plants were tended to by famous botanists such as Joseph Hubert, Nicolas Bréon and Jean-Michel-Claude Richard. At that time the garden housed 2000 species. 7000 of its plants were distributed to the islanders in 1825 as part of a scheme to improve the colonial agriculture.

Today, the garden's main entrance faces the historic Rue de Paris. In the garden itself a bust of Pierre Poivre and a Wallace fountain.

History
The Jardin de l'État was classified as a monument historique by the French Government on December 29, 1978.

Trees
The garden is home to around fifty species of tree, including:

Adansonia digitata - African baobab
Adenanthera pavonina - Barbados pride
Araucaria columnaris - Cook pine
Artocarpus heterophyllus - Jackfruit
Averrhoa carambola - Carambola
Bambusa glaucescens - Golden goddess bamboo
Barringtonia asiatica - Sea poison tree
Caryota mitis - Fishtail palm
Chrysophyllum cainito - Cainito
Cocos nucifera - Coconut palm
Cordia amplifolia 
Couroupita guianensis - Cannonball tree
Crescentia cujete - Calabash tree
Damara araucaria
Dictyosperma album - Hurricane palm or Princess palm
Elaeis guineensis - Oil palm or African oil palm
Elaeodendron orientale - Olive wood
Enterolobium cyclocarpum - Elephant ear tree
Eucalyptus citriodora - Lemon-scented gum
Ficus microcarpa - Chinese banyan
Heritiera littoralis - Looking-glass mangrove
Hymenaea courbaril - Jatobá
Inga laurina
Khaya senegalensis - Senegal mahogany
Kigelia africana - Sausage tree
Livistona chinensis - Chinese fan palm
Majidea zanguebarica - Blackpearl
Mangifera indica - Mango tree
Melaleuca quinquenervia - Broad-leaved paperbark
Mimusops coriacea
Pandanus sanderi - Screw pine
Pandanus utilis - Common screwpine
Peltophorum pterocarpum - Yellow poinciana
Pterocarpus indicus - Angsana
Ravenala madagascariensis - Travellers palm
Roystonea oleracea - Trinidad royal palm or Venezuela royal palm
Samanea saman - Saman or rain tree, monkey pod, cenizaro or cow tamarind
Senna siamea - Siamese cassia
Sterculia foetida - Stinky sterculia or Sterculia nut or Java olive
Syzygium cumini - Jambul or Jamun or Jamblang
Tabebuia pallida - Cuban pink trumpet tree
Tamarindus indica - Tamarind
Terminalia arjuna 
Terminalia catappa - Indian almond, Bengal almond, Singapore almond, Malabar almond, Tropical almond, Sea almond, or Umbrella tree
Vitex doniana - African black plum
Yucca guatemalensis - Spineless yucca

And also:
Carambole marron
Coing de Chine
Ficus banian
Garcinéa
Palmier bouteille
Santal
Zévis de l'Inde

Bibliography
Guide du jardin de l'État de Saint-Denis, J. Dequaire, Srepen, July 1984.

See also

 Conservatoire botanique national de Mascarin
 List of botanical gardens in France

References

Etat, Jardin de l'
Etat, Jardin de l'
1773 establishments in Africa
Saint-Denis, Réunion
1773 establishments in France